In the 1928 Isle of Man Tourist Trophy the newly developed 'positive-stop' foot gear-change by Velocette gave Alec Bennett his fifth TT Race win in the 1928 Junior, in the time of 3 hours, 50 minutes and 52 seconds, at an average speed of , and setting a lap record at an average speed of , with his teammate Harold Willis coming second.

In contrast the 1928 Senior TT Race was held in heavy rain and mist. The bad race conditions produced many retirements and a slow average speed.

Senior TT (500cc)

Junior TT (350cc)

Lightweight TT (250cc)

External links
 Detailed race results
 Isle of Man TT winners
 Mountain Course map

Isle of Man TT
1928
Isle